Enrique R. Arzac (born 1941) is a financial economist and Professor Emeritus of finance and economics at Columbia University specialized in corporate finance.

Education
Enrique R. Arzac obtained a CPN degree from the University of Buenos Aires, and MBA, MA in economics and Ph.D. in financial economics from Columbia University. His research spans several areas of economics including asset pricing, commodity markets and corporate finance.

Career
Arzac's contributions include the development of loss aversion asset pricing when investors follow a generalization of Roy's safety-first criterion. Asset pricing under loss aversion provides the theoretical foundation for Value at risk portfolio management and the framework for empirical research of the extreme returns observed in emerging markets and after black swan events (see, Black swan theory).

In a testimony given in 1985 to the United States Court of Appeals for the Federal Circuit, Arzac stated, testified without rebuttal that the appropriate method for calculating delay damages to make [the plaintiff] whole would be by using compound interest and showed the inequity of using simple interest. His testimony persuaded the Court that "compound interest may more nearly fit with the policy to accomplish complete justice as between the plaintiff and the United States" under the just compensation clause of the Fifth Amendment. This landmark case effectively changed the centuries-old interpretation of the just compensation clause of the Fifth Amendment of the United States Constitution and has been the basis of compensation judgements ever since.

References

External links

Columbia University faculty
Financial economists
20th-century Argentine economists
21st-century Argentine economists
Columbia University alumni
Living people
1943 births